The 2007–08 season was the 102nd in the history of RC Lens and their 17th consecutive season in the top flight. The club participated in Ligue 1, the Coupe de France, the Coupe de la Ligue and the UEFA Cup.

Transfers

In

Out

Pre-season and friendlies

Competitions

Overall record

Ligue 1

League table

Results summary

Results by round

Matches
The league fixtures were announced in June 2007.

Coupe de France

Coupe de la Ligue

UEFA Cup

Second qualifying round 
The draw was held on 3 August 2007.

First round 
The draw was held on 31 August 2007.

References

RC Lens seasons
Lens